Henry Tingle Wilde, RNR (21 September 1872 – 15 April 1912) was a British naval officer who was the chief officer of the . He died in the sinking.

Early life
Henry Tingle Wilde was born on 21 September 1872 in Walton, north of Liverpool, England. He was the son of Henry Wilde, an insurance surveyor from Ecclesfield, South Yorkshire. His mother was Elizabeth Tingle of Loxley, Bradfield. Wilde was christened at the Loxley Congregational Chapel in Loxley, Sheffield on 24 October 1872. Henry was known as Harry among his friends. He went to sea in his teens. He apprenticed with Messrs. James Chambers & Co., Liverpool. His apprenticeship began on 23 October 1889, on board the 1835-ton Greystoke Castle, and concluded four years later on 22 October 1893.  From there, he served as third mate aboard the Greystoke Castle, and then moved on to third mate of the 1374-ton Hornsby Castle.  His first steamship posting was aboard the S.S. Brunswick in 1895, where he served initially as third mate, then as second mate.  In 1896, he transferred to the S.S. Europa and served aboard her as second mate.  In July 1897, he joined the White Star Line.

Starting as a junior officer, Wilde rose steadily through the ranks while serving on several White Star ships. These included the Covic, Cufic, Tauric, and Delphic. Tragedy struck in December 1910 when Wilde's wife and twin sons Archie and Richard died.

Wilde was an officer of the Royal Naval Reserve, where he was commissioned a sub-lieutenant on 26 June 1902.

Titanic
Wilde was scheduled to leave Southampton on Olympic on 3 April 1912, but a reshuffle on board the Titanic caused the lowering of a rank of William McMaster Murdoch and Charles Lightoller to First and Second Officer, respectively, with Second Officer David Blair being removed from the ship entirely. On the ship's sailing day, 10 April 1912, Wilde reported for duty at 6:00 a.m. Around the time of departure, he was assisting Lightoller in casting off mooring ropes and in securing of tug lines. After the ship was put to sea, Wilde worked the 2–6 watches.

On the Titanic, Wilde wrote a letter to his sister in which he mentioned that he had "a queer feeling about the ship", although the letter, if it exists, has never been made public.

At 11:40 p.m., on 14 April, the ship hit an iceberg. Immediately after the collision, Wilde moved forward to inspect the forepeak and see the flooding for himself. He then came back to the bridge to make a report just before the carpenter arrived. The two reports seem to have convinced Smith that the ship was sinking. While Murdoch was in charge of the evacuation of the starboard boats, with Lightoller for the port side, it appears that Wilde supervised the overall process. He delayed launching the lifeboats and allowed himself twice to be over-ridden by Lightoller going to Captain Smith. In the ensuing evacuation, Wilde helped in the loading of Lifeboats No. 8, 14, 12, 16, 2, and 10. He took charge of filling and lowering the even-numbered lifeboats on the port side and also gave firearms to both Lightoller and First Officer Murdoch. As they left the cabin, Lightoller heard Wilde say "I am going to put on my life-belt." By 1:40 a.m., most of the port lifeboats had been lowered, and Wilde moved to the starboard side. Steward James Johnston and Fourth Officer Boxhall saw Wilde putting women and children into lifeboat no.2 and superintending the filling. At 10, chief baker Charles Joughin saw Wilde conducting affairs, shouting at the stewards to keep a large number of passengers gathered back. When the boat was full, Wilde then picked out the men to take charge of it: two sailors and a steward. Ismay testified that Wilde was the officer who was in charge of collapsible C. At D, Wilde told Lightoller, "You go with her, Lightoller." Lightoller said, "Not damned likely!", and jumped back on the ship in defiance of Wilde's order.

Death
An account in the Cornish Post of 2 May 1912, claimed that Wilde was last seen on the bridge smoking a cigarette, and that he waved goodbye to Lightoller as the ship sank. Lightoller himself made no mention of this, in his accounts.

Wilde's body was never recovered.

His name is recorded on a family tombstone at Kirkdale Cemetery in Liverpool, marked by an obelisk and gravestone. The inscription reads, "Also Captain [sic] Henry T. Wilde, RNR Acting Chief Officer Who Met His Death in the SS Titanic Disaster 15th April 1912 aged 38 years [sic]. 'One of Britain’s Heroes'".

Portrayals
Howard Lang (1958) (A Night to Remember)
Tony Caunter (1979) (S.O.S. Titanic)
Mark Lindsay Chapman (1997) (Titanic)
Will Keen (2012) (Titanic) (TV series/4 episodes)

See also

Encyclopedia Titanica

References

Bibliography

External links
Henry Wilde on Titanic-Titanic.com
Encyclopedia Titanica article on Henry Tingle Wilde

1872 births
1912 deaths
Deaths on the RMS Titanic
British Merchant Navy officers
Royal Navy officers
Royal Naval Reserve personnel